Lizbeth Stewart (December 22, 1948 – June 24, 2013), who is also known as Lizbeth McNett Stewart, was an American ceramist who was born in Philadelphia and grew up in Southampton, Pennsylvania.  She was awarded a bachelor's degree in fine arts from Moore College of Art and Design in 1971.  In 1990, she  married Matthew C. Gruskin.  For 30 years, she taught ceramics at the University of the Arts (Philadelphia), before retiring as a professor emeritus in December, 2012.  She died June 24, 2013 of lung cancer at her home in Yardley, Pennsylvania.

Stewart is best known for her hand-built ceramic portrayals of animals.  Typically, the modeling is realistic, but the painting is stylized.  Monkey with Roses, in the collection of the Honolulu Museum of Art, is typical of her larger works and demonstrates this dichotomy, as well as her use of separate ceramic flowers to create an environment.  The Hermitage Museum (St. Petersburg, Russia), the Honolulu Museum of Art, the Smithsonian American Art Museum (Washington, D.C.), and the Winterthur Museum (Winterthur, Delaware) are among the public collections holding work by Lizbeth Stewart.

Footnotes

References
 Philadelphia Museum of Art, Philadelphia, Three Centuries of American Art, Philadelphia Museum of Art, 1976, pp. 641–642 
 Torchia, Richard, From the Ground Up: Ten Philadelphia Clay Artists, Moore College of Art and Design, 1992, pp. 15–16

External links
 Cook, Bonnie L., "Lizbeth Stewart, ceramicist known for her animals" in The Inquirer, July 05, 2013
 Smithsonian American Art Museum website

1948 births
2013 deaths
20th-century ceramists
21st-century ceramists
American ceramists
American women ceramists
Deaths from lung cancer
Moore College of Art and Design alumni
University of the Arts (Philadelphia) faculty
20th-century American women artists
21st-century American women artists
Artists from Philadelphia
People from Bucks County, Pennsylvania
American women academics